Our Lady of the Blessed Sacrament Church is a Roman Catholic church at 844 Sullivan Street in Miami, Arizona, United States. It was built in 1917 and was added to the National Register of Historic Places in 2008.

Gallery

See also

 List of historic properties in Miami, Arizona

References

Churches in Gila County, Arizona
Mission Revival architecture in Arizona
Churches on the National Register of Historic Places in Arizona
Roman Catholic churches completed in 1917
Roman Catholic churches in Arizona
National Register of Historic Places in Gila County, Arizona
20th-century Roman Catholic church buildings in the United States